Hettefjorden is a lake in the municipality of Nore og Uvdal in Viken county, Norway. It is located east on Hardangervidda, just inside the border of Hardangervidda National Park. It is the Skiensvassdraget watershed.

See also
List of lakes in Norway

References

Lakes of Viken (county)
Nore og Uvdal